Natalia Arias is a photographer. She was born in Brighton, United Kingdom in 1977, raised in Bogotá, Colombia and now currently lives and works in Miami, Florida.

Education 
She attended Savannah College of Art and Design in 2000, and received her B.F.A in photography from there. In 2002 she attended the portfolio program in Miami Ad School of Graphic Design.

Awards 
In 1999 she received the Sean Moran Memorial Scholarship.

One-Person Exhibitions 
Natalia Arias has exhibited various times in and out of the United States.

 2017     "New Place, New Space," Nohra Haime Gallery, New York;  "People, Places, and Things," Atrium Gallery, Saint Louis, MO; "Feminist Feminine," Nohra Haime Gallery, New York
 2016     "Fotografias," Museo Rayo, Roldanillo, Colombia;  "Introspection: Major Works by Gallery Artists," Nohra Haime Gallery, New York; "100+ Degrees in the Shade: A Survey of South Florida Art," Miami, FL
 2015 "Class of 2015," Nohra Haime Gallery, New York
 2014 PULSE Miami Beach, Nohra Haime Gallery, Miami "Femininity Beyond Archetypes: Photography by Natalia Arias," Art Museum of the Americas, Washington D.C.
 2013 "No Permanent, No Perpetual," Galería Artespacio, Santiago, Chile "News," NH Galeria, Cartagena de Indias, Colombia
 2012 "No Permanent, No Perpetual," Nohra Haime Gallery, New York
 2011 "Change," NH Galería, Cartagena de Indias 2010 "Venus," ARTBO, Nohra Haime Gallery, Bogota, Colombia "Goddesses," NEXT, Nohra Haime Gallery, Chicago, IL
 2006 "Venus," Nohra Haime Gallery, New York
 2005 "Taboo – Passages," Nohra Haime Gallery, New York

References

External links
http://www.nataliaariasphoto.com/BIO
 http://www.artnet.com/artists/natalia-arias/

Colombian photographers
Colombian women photographers
Living people
1977 births
Savannah College of Art and Design alumni